Edith Hall may refer to:

People
 Edith Hall (born 1959), British classics scholar and Professor at King's College London
 Edith Hall Dohan (1877–1943), American archaeologist

Other uses
 St Edith Hall, Kemsing, Kent, UK

See also

 
 Edith 
 Hall (disambiguation)